Johannes Mallow (born June 7, 1981 Brandenburg an der Havel) is a German memory sportsman. He is a two-time winner of the World Memory Championships. He studied successfully Communication Technology at the Otto-von-Guericke University of Magdeburg and finalized his PhD thesis in 2016 at the University of Duisburg-Essen. He also works as a mind coach and scientific author.

Victories
 2018 IAM World Memory Champion
 2017 Memory Champion of the IAM-AMSC Korea Open
 2016 Memory Champion of the Regional German Open Memory Championship
 2015 Memory Champion of Germany
 2015 Extreme Memory Tournament Champion
 2013 runner-up at World Memory Championships
 2013 Memory Champion of Germany
 2012 World Memory Champion
 2012 Memoriad - Binary Digits World Memory Champion
 2012 Memory Champion of Germany
 2011 runner-up at Memory Championship of Germany
 2010 runner-up at World Memory Championships
 2010 Memory Champion of Germany
 2009 runner-up at World Memory Championships
 2008 Memory Champion of Germany
 2008 Memory Champion of North Germany
 2007 World Memory Champion in the discipline of Historical Dates
 2007 Memory Champion of North Germany
 2006 Memory Champion of North Germany

World records
 Memorize 400 play cards in 10 minutes (April 9, 2016 in Lübeck/Germany at the Regional German Open Memory Championship
 Memorize 501 numbers in 5 minutes (December 1, 2013 in London/England at the World Memory Championship 2013)
 Memorize 1080 binary numbers in 5 minutes (September 22, 2013 in Gothenburg/Sweden at the Swedish Memory Open Championship 2013)
 Memorize 937 numbers in 15 minutes (September 22, 2013 in Gothenburg/Sweden at the Swedish Memory Open Championship 2013)
 Memorize 364 spoken numbers (September 22, 2013 in Gothenburg/Sweden at the Swedish Memory Open Championship 2013) 
 Memorize 492 abstract images in 15 minutes (July 27, 2013 in Isny im Allgäu/Germany at the German Memory Championship 2013)
 Memorize 132 Historical Dates out of 140 in 5 minutes (September 25, 2011 in Gothenburg/Sweden at the Swedish Memory Open Championship 2011)

Memory System
He currently uses the Method of loci. Many memory sportsmen use this method. His particular instance of the method uses 1,000 images with corresponding numbers, so that each combination of 3 digits corresponds to a unique image.

https://www.areweeurope.com/stories/johannes-mallow-fshd

References

External links
 Johannes Mallow on German TV Talkshow 07/2008
 statistics and records
 German association for Memory Sports
 private website
 Memoriad - World Mental Olympics Website

1981 births
Living people
Mnemonists